The Table Tennis at the 1981 Southeast Asian Games was held between 07 December to 11 December at Pasay Sport Complex, Manila, Philippine.

Medal summary

Medal table

References
 https://eresources.nlb.gov.sg/newspapers/Digitised/Article/straitstimes19811208-1.2.144
 https://eresources.nlb.gov.sg/newspapers/Digitised/Article/straitstimes19811209-1.2.133.6
 https://eresources.nlb.gov.sg/newspapers/Digitised/Article/straitstimes19811210-1.2.115.4
 https://eresources.nlb.gov.sg/newspapers/Digitised/Article/straitstimes19811214-1.2.122.5

1981
Southeast Asian Games
1981 Southeast Asian Games events
Table tennis competitions in the Philippines